The following is a list of notable people who were either born in, are current residents of, or are otherwise closely associated with or from Erode district, Tamil Nadu, India.

B

K. Bhagyaraj, film actor

C

Dheeran Chinnamalai, freedom fighter
S. Selvakumara Chinnayan, politician

G

P. K. Gopal, social worker and philanthropist

I

A. V. Ilango, writer and artist

K

Tiruppur Kumaran, freedom fighter

L

G. S. Lakshmanan, freedom fighter and philanthropist
G. V. Loganathan, professor; killed in Virginia Tech shooting

M

S. K. M. Maeilanandhan, entrepreneur
Mayilsamy, comedian and actor

P
Pongalur N. Palanisamy, politician

R

Srinivasa Ramanujan, mathematical prodigy and autodidact
Periyar E. V. Ramasamy, social activist and politician
K. S. Ramaswamy Gounder, freedom fighter and former union minister

S
J. Sudhanandhen Mudaliyar, educationalist, philanthropist, textile merchant.
M. P. Saminathan, politician
P. Sathasivam, former Chief Justice of India
K. A. Sengottaiyan, Minister for School Education in the Tamil Nadu Government
K B Sundarambal, actress
Sundar C, director and actor

References

Lists of people by city in India
Lists of people from Tamil Nadu
Erode district